Diptilon telamonophorum is a moth of the subfamily Arctiinae. It was described by Otto von Prittwitz in 1870. It is found in the Brazilian states of Rio de Janeiro and Minas Gerais.

References

Euchromiina
Moths described in 1870